Bertie Ison Martin Conley (June 30, 1873 – October 29, 1939) was the wife of former Governor of West Virginia William G. Conley, and served as that state's First Lady from 1929 to 1933.  She was born at Preston County, West Virginia.  In 1892, she married William G. Conley.  As first lady, she redecorated the West Virginia Governor's Mansion, adding outdoor gardens and artistic furnishings.  On her 59th birthday and 69th anniversary of West Virginia statehood, she and her husband dedicated the new West Virginia State Capitol.  After leaving office, the Conleys remained in Charleston, West Virginia, where she died at her home on Virginia Street.

References

1873 births
1939 deaths
People from Preston County, West Virginia
First Ladies and Gentlemen of West Virginia